"Trampolene" is a song by the English singer-songwriter Julian Cope. It is the second single released in support of his third album Saint Julian.

Formats and track listing 
All songs written by Julian Cope.
UK 7" single (IS 305)
"Trampolene" – 3:38
"Disaster" – 4:58

UK 12" single (12 IS 305)
"Trampolene" – 3:38
"Disaster" – 4:58
"Mock Turtle" – 4:23
"Warwick the Kingmaker" – 3:52

UK 12" remix single" single (12 ISX 305)
"Trampolene" [Remix by Warne Livesey - Long Version]  – 5:53
"Trampolene" – 3:38
"Disaster" – 4:58

Chart positions

References

External links 
 

1987 singles
Julian Cope songs
Island Records singles
1987 songs